Natalie Zea (born March 17, 1975) is an American actress known for her performances on television. Zea began her acting career in theatre. Her first major role was on the NBC daytime soap opera Passions (2000–2002),  where she played the role of Gwen Hotchkiss. Her breakout role was on the ABC primetime soap opera Dirty Sexy Money as socialite Karen Darling, where she starred from 2007 to 2009. Zea also has made many guest appearances on television, starred in a number of independent and made-for-television movies, and had recurring roles in The Shield, Hung, Californication, and The Unicorn.

In 2010, Zea began starring as Winona Hawkins in the FX critically acclaimed crime drama series Justified as a regular cast member during the first three seasons and recurring guest star later. In 2013, she also began starring as Claire Matthews in the Fox drama series The Following. Zea played lead character Mickey Holmes-Harris on the canceled-before-airing ABC dramedy series, Members Only, and starred in the 2016–2019 TBS sitcom The Detour. In 2020, Zea had a recurring role as Shannon in the CBS sitcom The Unicorn.

Early life
Zea was born in Harris County, Texas, attending high school in Monahans, graduating in 1993. She graduated from the American Musical and Dramatic Academy in New York City in 1995. Also in 1995, Zea co-starred as Lana Tisdel in the short film Boys Don't Cry. In the 1999 feature film version of Boys Don't Cry, the role was played by Chloë Sevigny. She also appeared in many national commercials for companies such as Dove, Snickers and Hellman's Salad Dressing.

Career

1995–2009
Zea began her career in an Off-Broadway theatre, appearing in productions of The Three Sisters and A Midsummer Night's Dream. She made her feature debut in the Shakespeare-themed independent drama Macbeth in Manhattan in 1999.  In the following year, Zea made her television debut in an episode of short-lived The WB drama series, D.C.. Later in that year she was cast as Gwen Hotchkiss Winthrop, a businesswoman and socialite, and the member of the wealthy Hotchkiss family, in the  NBC daytime soap opera Passions. She appeared in the show on a regular basis from November 15, 2000, to October 3, 2002. On her leaving, Zea said "I have decided not to renew my contract with Passions. Although I enjoyed my experience, and learned quite a bit, especially initially, I know that the best thing for my career, and my craft, is to pursue new challenges. So after some deliberation, an amicable parting of ways seemed to be the best decision". Zea is the second actress who played the role of Gwen. Susan Lucci's daughter Liza Huber played the role from July 5, 1999, to November 8, 2000, and again, after Zea left the show.

In 2004, Zea was cast in a recurring role in the FX police drama series The Shield. She played the role of Lauren Riley, a love interest of Michael Chiklis' character Vic Mackey. The following year, Zea won her first series regular role on primetime television, on the ABC drama series, Eyes opposite Tim Daly. The series was canceled after a single season. Her next major role was on the ABC primetime soap opera/comedy-drama Dirty Sexy Money opposite Jill Clayburgh, Donald Sutherland and Peter Krause. Zea played spoiled socialite Karen Darling. The soap aired from 2007 to 2009, and was canceled after two seasons. In 2009, she had a recurring role during the first season of the HBO comedy series Hung. She also had many guest-starring roles, on CSI: Crime Scene Investigation, Two and a Half Men, Without a Trace, Medium, Franklin & Bash, and Person of Interest.

2010–present
In 2010, Zea began starring as series regular during the first three seasons of the FX drama Justified, changing to a recurring role from Season 4. She played the role of Winona Hawkins, the ex-wife of Raylan Givens. Zea was originally a guest star in the pilot for Justified, but was made a regular right after the pilot with a two-year deal. Alongside her regular role on Justified, from 2012 to 2013, Zea had the recurring role on Showtime comedy-drama, Californication as a new love interest for David Duchovny' character. In film, Zea had supporting role in the 2010 comedy The Other Guys. As lead actress, she co-starred alongside Sean Patrick Flanery in the 2011 independent thriller InSight, and in the Lifetime movie Burden of Evil (2012).

In 2013, Zea starred in the major role of Dr. Claire Matthews, the estranged wife of a serial killer in the Fox drama series, The Following. She returned to show in second season on a recurring basis. Also in 2013, she had a recurring role as Maxine Seagrave, a drug and gambling kingpin, on the first season of CBS summer series, Under the Dome. Later in that year, Zea was cast in her first series leading role of the Amazon comedy pilot The Rebels. The pilot premiered in February 2014, but not was picked up to series. Later in that year, Zea was cast in two independent films: Too Late in the female lead role opposite John Hawkes, and The Grey Lady as lead character.

On August 4, 2014, it was announced that Zea was cast as lead character in the straight-to-series ordered  ABC primetime soap opera, Members Only. She plays the role of Mickey Holmes-Harris the "most well-educated and put-together member of the family that founded the country club around which the show is centered." Members Only was cancelled by ABC before premiere. On December 2, 2014, Zea was cast as lead opposite Jason Jones in the TBS vacation comedy  The Detour.

On February 26, 2020, Zea will play in the lead role of Eve Harris in the NBC apocalyptic drama series La Brea which was written by David Appelbaum.

In 2020, Zea had recurring roles in 9-1-1: Lone Star and The Unicorn.

Personal life
In June 2013, Zea announced her engagement to her former Passions co-star Travis Schuldt after 10 years of dating. The couple married on July 16, 2014, in Hawaii. In June 2015, they announced they were expecting their first child together. In October 2015, Zea gave birth to a daughter named Reygan.

Filmography

Film

Television

References

External links 

 
 

1975 births
Actresses from Texas
American film actresses
American soap opera actresses
American television actresses
Living people
Monahans High School alumni
People from Harris County, Texas
20th-century American actresses
21st-century American actresses
American Musical and Dramatic Academy alumni